Morvarid Darreh (also Romanized as Morvārīd Darreh; also known as Morvārīd and Morvārīdar) is a village in Nahr-e Mian Rural District, Zalian District, Shazand County, Markazi Province, Iran. At the 2006 census, its population was 497, in 131 families.

References 

Populated places in Shazand County